Wanted is the debut album by British pop singer Yazz, released in 1988.  The album contains the single "The Only Way Is Up", which reached number one in six countries. Wanted was certified double platinum in the UK in September 1989, for sales exceeding 600,000 copies.

A three-CD remastered deluxe edition, containing the original album plus B-sides, remixes and Yazz's 1990 non-album single "Treat Me Good", was released on Cherry Red Records on 25 November 2016.

Singles
"The Only Way Is Up" was the first single to be released from the album, reaching number one in the UK Singles Chart. Three further singles were released from the album: "Stand Up for Your Love Rights", "Fine Time" and "Where Has All the Love Gone?".

Track listing
"The Only Way Is Up"
"Where Has All the Love Gone"
"Got to Share"
"Fine Time"
"Stand Up for Your Love Rights"
"Wanted on the Floor"
"Something Special"
"Systematic People"
"Turn It Up"

Bonus tracks on CD
"The Only Way Is Up" (12" Version)
"Stand Up for Your Love Rights" (12" Version)

Charts

References

1988 debut albums
Yazz albums
Albums produced by Youth (musician)